Geoffrey Lee Miller  (26 January 194210 October 2014) was a senior Australian public servant.

Life and career
Geoff Miller was born in Grafton, New South Wales on 26 January 1942. For high school, he attended Farrer Memorial Agricultural High School in Tamworth, New South Wales. His university studies were at the University of New England where he completed a degree in agricultural economics with first class honours.

He began his career in a state agricultural department, before shifting to work for CSR Limited.

In 1986, Miller was appointed Secretary of the Department of Primary Industry. In July 1987 he became Associate Secretary of the Department of Foreign Affairs and Trade, but was again appointed as a Secretary in 1988, this time of the Department of Primary Industries and Energy. During the period December 1991 to June 1993, Miller was concurrently Secretary to the Department of Primary Industries and Energy and the Department of Tourism.

As an associate secretary of the Department of Primary Industries and Energy, Miller bid for the position of Director-General of the United Nations Food and Agricultural Organisation. He was defeated in a ballot for the position by 90 votes to 72 votes. The Australian Government spent more than $500,000 on the unsuccessful campaign to have Miller appointed to the position. Miller retired from the public service in February 1994.

Miller died on 10 October 2014.

Awards
Miller was awarded Man of the Year in Australian Agriculture in 1978.

In June 1993, Miller was made an Officer of the Order of Australia for service to primary industry, particularly in the area of agricultural economics and to international relations.

References

1942 births
2014 deaths
Australian public servants
Officers of the Order of Australia
People from Grafton, New South Wales